Bryan Keith is an American singer based in New York City. His father is a two-time Grammy-winning artist.

The Voice
Bryan Keith was a contestant on the third season of The Voice, and came in at third place on Adam Levine's team. All four coaches, Adam Levine, Cee Lo Green, Christina Aguilera, and Blake Shelton, pushed their I WANT YOU buttons. Bryan elected to join Team Adam.

References

American rock singers
21st-century American singers
Place of birth missing (living people)
Year of birth missing (living people)
Singers from New York City
The Voice (franchise) contestants
Living people